Mealsechlainn Ó hEodhasa, Irish poet, died 1504.

Mealsechlainn was a brother of Ciothruaidh Ó hEodhasa, who died in 1518.

The Annals of the Four Masters record his death in 1504:

 Melaghlin, the son of Ahairne O'Hussey ... died.

See also

 Aengus Ó hEodhasa, poet, died 1480.
 Giolla Brighde Ó hEoghusa, poet, 1608–1614.
 Gemma Hussey, Fine Gael TD and Minister, 1977–1989.

References
 http://www.ucc.ie/celt/published/T100005E/

People from County Fermanagh
15th-century Irish poets
Irish male poets